50 Cent: Bulletproof is an action video game developed by Genuine Games and published by Vivendi Universal Games for the PlayStation 2 and Xbox, which released on November 17, 2005. The game was reworked into a PlayStation Portable version titled 50 Cent: Bulletproof G Unit Edition, with a top-down perspective, which released in 2006. A sequel, 50 Cent: Blood on the Sand, was released in 2009.

The story revolves around protagonist hip hop musician 50 Cent's search for vengeance against the hitmen who attempted to murder him. The game features members of the G-Unit rap crew as a gang. Dr. Dre plays an arms dealer, Eminem plays a corrupt police officer, and DJ Whoo Kid plays himself as a person selling "bootlegged" music (of the G-Unit camp) out of his trunk. A soundtrack album, titled Bulletproof, was released by DJ Red Heat's Shadyville Entertainment. It won "Best Original Song" in the 2005 Spike TV Video Game Awards.

Plot
50 Cent finds himself being dragged back into the criminal underworld, taking on the most dangerous criminal organizations in New York City.

50 Cent gets a call at home from his former cellmate and friend K Dog, letting him know he is in trouble. 50 Cent leaves and gets his crew together: rappers Lloyd Banks, Young Buck and Tony Yayo. The crew goes to Queens, where they see K Dog being physically assaulted by unknown masked assailants. After killing the assailants and the assailants' masked leader Van Sykes, 50 Cent is shot nine times and left for dead. 50 Cent is brought to Doc Friday, a former licensed doctor until he started writing prescriptions for himself. After recovering, 50 Cent goes to Detective Aaron McVicar (Eminem), a corrupt cop, for information. McVicar agrees to help 50 Cent in exchange for money and a personal favor. 50 Cent and Lloyd Banks go to see K Dog at a safehouse in Scarsdale, New York, where they run into the same masked men from earlier as well as other security guards. 50 discovers K Dog dead as well as the federal prosecutors' corpses.

50 gets K Dog's belongings and brings it back to Bugs, who is able to listen to the messages left on the phone. The messages say K Dog was supposed to meet up with "Spyder", a crystal meth drug dealer about transport routes. 50 goes after Spyder and goes to a junkyard to meet up with him. After killing Spyder's assailants along with McVicar, he kills Spyder and collects a document with an address presumably related to transportation schedules. 50 notices a tattoo similar to the one on K Dog. He cuts Spyder's skin with the tattoo on it and gives it to Bugs. The tattoo is traced back to Wu-Jang, a Chinese drug kingpin. 50 confronts Wu Jang at his office in Chinatown, Manhattan, kills him and his assailants and takes his money.

While returning home on the subway train, 50 Cent later finds himself being hunted by masked assailants, who have tracked him from K Dog's cellphone. Though he is able to kill some, the train breaks down and ends up in an abandoned subway. He fights his way through the subway system and kills the masked assailants' leader, taking his wallet which belongs to DEA special agent Gabriel Espinoza. After this, McVicar cashes in on the favor 50 owes him for the safehouse location. McVicar requests 50 to kill Lou Petra, a fellow corrupt detective who agreed to testify against McVicar in exchange for immunity. 50 Cent and Tony Yayo go to a series of old housing projects, fighting their way through Petra's gang before killing Lou Petra himself.

50 Cent then goes to Booker, a former coast guard who is now homeless, for information related to the document. Booker reads the document and sees that the address listed is at a warehouse in the Docklands. 50 Cent goes to the Docklands and meets the head of the warehouse, O' Hara. When 50 attempts to extract information about transportation shipping schedules from Colombia, Turkey, and Afghanistan, O'Hara locks 50 in the warehouse. It is revealed that O'Hara worked with Spyder in drug trafficking. After 50 Cent and Young Buck kill O'Hara and his biker gang, 50 retrieves the transportation schedule.

Returning back home, 50 goes to Booker with the schedule when Booker is seemingly gunned down by the biker gang. At his funeral, it is revealed that Booker had a daughter.

Development

G Unit Edition
On August 29, 2006, Vivendi Universal Games released a G Unit Edition for the PlayStation Portable. While the story and cutscenes are the same as the console counterpart, the game eschews the third-person perspective game-play for a top-down, isometric viewpoint. Also added is multiplayer game-play through ad hoc wireless connectivity. The PlayStation Portable version featured a "Vitamin Water" minigame in which the player plays as 50 Cent at the apex of his business endeavors.

Soundtrack

The soundtrack was released in November, 2005 and features 13 new songs from 50 Cent. Consumers who pre-ordered the album were also given a previously unreleased DVD of 50 Cent's 2003 European tour called "No Fear, No Mercy".

Track listing
All tracks produced by Sha Money XL, except "Pimpin, Part 2" produced by J.Bonkaz

Reception

50 Cent: Bulletproof received generally mixed reviews due to poor gameplay mechanics but was praised for its solid storyline and music. It received 1 out of 5 and a Golden Mullet from X-Play. In spite of this, it received a positive rating of 8/10 from Official UK PlayStation 2 Magazine.

The PlayStation Portable G Unit Edition received mixed reviews from critics. GameSpot's Alex Navarro did, however, say that it was a better game than the PS2 or Xbox versions.

50 Cent: Bulletproof sold 1,123,000 copies, according to NPD Group (it is unclear whether this figure includes the PSP's "G-Unit Edition" release). By July 2006, the PlayStation 2 version had sold 600,000 copies and earned $27 million in the United States. Next Generation ranked it as the 98th-highest-selling game launched for the PlayStation 2, Xbox or GameCube between January 2000 and July 2006 in that country. Overall sales of Bulletproof reached 850,000 units in the United States by July 2006. Its PlayStation 2 version received a "Gold" sales award from the Entertainment and Leisure Software Publishers Association (ELSPA), indicating sales of at least 200,000 copies in the United Kingdom.

References

External links 
 
  (PSP)

2005 video games
50 Cent
Video games based on musicians
Organized crime video games
PlayStation 2 games
PlayStation Portable games
Third-person shooters
Video games developed in the United States
Video games set in New York City
Xbox games
Band-centric video games
Video games about the illegal drug trade
Video games based on real people
Video games using Havok
Video games featuring black protagonists
Multiplayer and single-player video games